The Weaker Sex (French: Le Sexe faible) is a 1933 French comedy film directed by Robert Siodmak and starring Mireille Balin, Victor Boucher and Pierre Brasseur. It was based on a 1929 stage farce of the same name by Édouard Bourdet.

It was shot at the Epinay Studios in Paris. The film's sets were designed by the art directors Jacques-Laurent Atthalin and Hugues Laurent.

Cast
 Victor Boucher as Antoine 
 Jeanne Cheirel as Madame Leroy-Gómez 
 Betty Stockfeld as Dorothy Freeman
 Marguerite Moreno as La comtesse Polacchi 
 Pierre Brasseur as Jimmy 
 Mireille Balin as Nicole 
 Suzanne Dantès as Christina 
 Fernand Fabre as Manuel 
 Philippe Hériat as Philippe 
 Maud Mayer as Clarisse 
 José Noguéro as Carlos Pinto 
 Nadine Picard as Lily
 Suzy Delair as une couturière
 Marcel Maupi as le faux policier

References

Bibliography 
Oscherwitz, Dayna & Higgins, Maryellen. The A to Z of French Cinema. Scarecrow Press, 2009.

External links 
 
 (small portion of film)

1933 films
French comedy films
1933 comedy films
1930s French-language films
Films directed by Robert Siodmak
French films based on plays
Films shot at Epinay Studios
French black-and-white films
1930s French films